Azerbaijani populations exist throughout the world. About 8.2 million Azerbaijanis live in Azerbaijan (2009 census), making 91.6% of the country's population. According to the CIA website, Azerbaijanis are the second ethnic group in Georgia (6.3% in 2014) and in Iran.

Most recent data

Notes

References

Azerbaijani diaspora
Ethnic Azerbaijani people by country of citizenship